Big Foot is a 1927 crime novel by Edgar Wallace.

This is one of the most significant of his works because of the character Sooper, a detective from Metropolitan Guard. A woman is found dead in a locked room, Big Foot's threats all about... but - apparently - Sooper is more concerned about a singing tramp.

The brutal murder of a woman in a lonely beach cottage, huge footprints found nearby, a meandering tramp singing snatches of opera in the night! Superintendent Minter - "Sooper", rattles around the countryside on his noisy motorbike and tries to find a connection.

Hampered by amateur detective Gordon Cardew, aided and admired by lawyer Jim Ferraby and the beautiful Elfa Leigh, Sooper finds the case further complicated by another murder. The mysterious `Big Foot' anticipates Minter's every move and only by delving into the past does he solve the case and bring the villain to justice.

External links
Full text of The Big Foot at Project Gutenberg Australia

1927 British novels
British crime novels
Locked-room mysteries
Novels by Edgar Wallace
John Long Ltd books